Elisenda Alamany i Gutiérrez (born 1983) is a Spanish teacher and politician, currently serving as a member of the City Council of Barcelona, since June 2019. From January 2018 to April 2019 she was a deputy in the 12th Legislature of the Parliament of Catalonia. Initially part of the coalition Catalunya en Comú–Podem, she was the spokesperson for its parliamentary group from 18 January to 29 October 2018. In October 2018, she promoted the platform Sobiranistes (Sovereigntists) as a criticism of the leadership of En Comú Podem. In February 2019 she left the parliamentary group but kept her seat. On 24 February 2019, she announced the creation of the party .

Biography
Elisenda Alamany holds a licentiate in Catalan philology and has worked as a secondary education teacher.

Her political career is rooted in municipalism. In 2007, together with Gemma Ubasart and a group of residents of Castellar del Vallès, she founded the candidacy L'Altraveu per Castellar as an independent grouping of electors not affiliated with any political party. In the 2007 elections for Castellar del Vallés they obtained two councilors, who were revalidated in the 2011 elections.

In the 2015 elections for Castellar del Vallés, the Decidim Castellar candidacy – an alliance of L'Altraveu, Procés Constituent, United and Alternative Left, and Podemos – yielded four councilors.

Alamany won a seat as deputy of the Parliament of Catalonia in the 2017 regional election, where she was number 2 for the district of Barcelona for the electoral coalition Catalunya en Comú–Podem. She was the spokesperson for its parliamentary group from 18 January to 29 October 2018.

Identified with the Catalan independence movement, following the resignation of Xavier Domènech on 22 October 2018, she was a promoter of the manifesto Som Comuns. Som Sobiranistes and the platform Sobiranistes as a criticism of the direction of En Comú Podem. Together with Joan Josep Nuet, she denounced Catalunya en Comú–Podem for abandoning the issue of sovereignty, which had been one of its original values. On 29 October Alamany stepped down as spokesperson for the "Comuns" in Parliament.

On 19 February 2019 Alamany left the En Comú Podem parliamentary group, maintaining her seat in Parliament and announcing that she would dedicate herself to Sobiranistes, transforming it into a new party. On 24 February 2019, the new party's name was announced: .

In March 2019 it was reported that Sobiranistes was negotiating a coalition with the Republican Left of Catalonia for the Congress and City Council of Barcelona, and that Elisenda Alamany would be number 2 on the City Council list headed by Ernest Maragall.

Publications
 Construint municipi des dels moviments socials (2010), co-edited with Gemma Ubasart and Marc Serrà, Editorial Icaria, 

References

External links

 

1983 births
21st-century Spanish women writers
21st-century Spanish writers
Barcelona municipal councillors (2019–2023)
Educators from Catalonia
Women writers from Catalonia
Writers from Catalonia
Catalunya en Comú politicians
Living people
Members of the 12th Parliament of Catalonia
People from Sabadell
Academic staff of Pompeu Fabra University
University of Barcelona alumni
Women members of the Parliament of Catalonia